La boda de Valentina is a 2018 romantic comedy film directed by Marco Polo Constandse. The script was written by Santiago Limón, Issa López and Santiago Limón. The film stars Marimar Vega, Omar Chaparro and Ryan Carnes.

Plot  
Valentina lives in New York with her boyfriend who proposes to her. She has a good life going for her until her scandalous family in Mexico needs her to pretend to be engaged to her ex-boyfriend for awhile. She is denied a green card and heads to Mexico to talk to her father, a political figure, on getting rid of the fake engagement. She starts feeling bad and eventually gives in to her father's pleading. This leads to her posing with her ex as her heart struggles to tell her if she has made the right choice staying with her fiancé or falling again for her ex.

Cast 
 Marimar Vega : Valentina
 Omar Chaparro : Angel
 Ryan Carnes : Jason Tate
 Kate Vernon : Melanie Tate
 Christian Tappan : Demetrio
 Tony Dalton : Adrián Corcuera
 Jesús Zavala : Bernardo
 Sabine Moussier : Oralia

References

External links 

2018 films
Mexican romantic comedy films
2010s Spanish-language films
2018 romantic comedy films
2010s Mexican films